
The Yeni Kale Lighthouse (Enikal'skyy mayak, Yenikal'sky mayak) is an active lighthouse on Cape Fonar near Yeni-Kale fortress in eastern Crimea on the shore of Kerch Strait. Navigation cressets on this coast were first mentioned in the Periplus of Scylax, dated 350 BC.

History

In 1820 a lighthouse tower was built on the top of Cape Fonar to guide ships navigating from the Sea of Azov to Kerch Strait. Oil lamps were used as a light source. In 1861 Fresnel lens with kerosene lamps were installed.

Until the Second World War the Yeni Kale Lighthouse was considered as the oldest lighthouse in Crimea. In 1941, during World War II, the lighthouse equipment was evacuated to Taman coast by light-house keeper Mikhail Egorov. In May 1942 a battle between retreating Red Army and Nazi Germany took place in Cape Fonar area. Alexander Filimonov, a Soviet mariner, aimed the fire of Soviet batteries. When German tanks appeared near the lighthouse, a flag was risen on the tower targeting the Soviet fire from the Chushka Spit. The tower got destroyed in this battle and hydrographers besieged in the lighthouse died.
In 1943 a temporary light was installed on lighthouse ruins. When Kerch was liberated from German troops in April 1944, the lighthouse equipment was returned.

After the war a provisional wooden tower was constructed in 1946. It was replaced with an electric-powered lighthouse with a modern stone tower in 1953. The EMV-3 optical system was installed on the Yenikalsky Lighthouse in 1957. The lighthouse was equipped with a modern GLONASS-GPS system in 2002.

Gallery

See also

 List of lighthouses in Ukraine

References 

Lighthouses completed in 1820
Lighthouses completed in 1953
Lighthouses in Ukraine
Buildings and structures in Kerch
Tourist attractions in Crimea
1820s establishments in Ukraine
1820s establishments in the Russian Empire